Laura Balbo (born Padua, 30 November 1933) is an Italian sociologist and politician. A Fulbright Scholar, Balbo initially studied at the Universities of Padua and California, Berkeley before teaching at the Universities of Milan and Ferrara. She has also held visiting roles at Harvard University and the University of California, Santa Cruz. She has also served in the Italian Parliament, including holding cabinet positions under Massimo D'Alema between 1998 and 2000.

Academic career
Balbo graduated from the University of Padua in 1956 with a degree in sociology. She then went to the University of California, Berkeley as a Fulbright Scholar, returned to Italy and taught sociology at the University of Milan.  She was appointed professor at the university in 1968 and was later dean of the Faculty of Humanities at the University of Ferrara.

Her work covers racism, urbanization, family policies and the welfare state. She has a particular interest in women in society and coined the term double presence to describe the way that women have a responsibility to both private, family life and the public world of work.

She was Senior Fulbright Fellow at the Center for European Studies at Harvard University, visiting scholar at the Radcliffe Institute for Advanced Study (1963–1965) and visiting associate professor at the University of California, Berkeley and Santa Cruz (1980).

Political career
Balbo took leave from her university career and ran for parliament, gaining her first seat in 1983. She remained in parliament until 1992 as an independent and later as part of Sinistra indipendente (the Independent Left). She subsequently joined Verdi (the Greens).

She was asked by Massimo D'Alema to take on the role of Minister for Equal Opportunities from 1998 to 2000. She instigated efforts to expand the remit of equal opportunities to encompass discrimination on the basis of race and sexual orientation discrimination. For the first time in Italy, the issue of sexual orientation became the subject of a specific assignment in the Ministry, in the person of Franco Grillini.  She also worked to strengthen women's representation in politics and improve female employment, including organising the first national conference on female employment in Naples in January 2000, opened by President Carlo Azeglio Ciampi. Between 2000 and 2001, she was a special advisor to the Prime Minister on issues of discrimination and racism.

Works
Her publications include:

Other Activities

Honour 
 : Knight Grand Cross of the Order of Merit of the Italian Republic (6 november 2000)

References

20th-century Italian women politicians
1933 births
Living people
Politicians from Padua
Independent Left (Italy) politicians
Deputies of Legislature IX of Italy
Deputies of Legislature X of Italy
Italian women academics
Italian sociologists
Italian women sociologists
Women government ministers of Italy
University of Padua alumni
Academic staff of the University of Ferrara
Academic staff of the University of Milan
Knights Grand Cross of the Order of Merit of the Italian Republic
Women members of the Chamber of Deputies (Italy)
Fulbright alumni